This article uses Logar transcription.

The Torre Valley dialect or Ter Valley dialect is the westernmost and the most Romanized Slovene dialect. It is one of the most endangered Slovene dialects and is threatened with extinction. It is also one of the most archaic Slovene dialects, together with the Gail Valley and Natisone Valley dialects, which makes it interesting for typological research. It is spoken mainly in the Torre Valley in the Province of Udine in Italy, but also in western parts of the Municipality of Kobarid in the Slovene Littoral in Slovenia. The dialect borders the Soča dialect to the east, the Natisone Valley dialect to the southeast, Resian to the north, and Friulian to the southwest and west. The dialect belongs to the Littoral dialect group, and it evolved from Venetian–Karst dialect base.

Geographical extension 
The dialect is spoken mainly in northeastern Italy, in the province of Friuli-Venezia Giulia, roughly along the Torre River from Tarcento upstream. It also extends beyond this; it is bounded by Monti Musi to the north, by the Friulian plain to the west and south, and by Mount Joanaz to the east, completely filling the area between the Natisone Valley and the Resian dialect. The dialect thus also extends into Slovenia, to the Breginj Combe in the Municipality of Kobarid in the Slovene Littoral, being spoken in villages such as Breginj, Logje, and Borjana. Larger settlements in the dialect area include Montefosca, Prossenicco, Canebola, Cergneu, Torlano, Taipana, Monteaperta, Vedronza, Lusevera, Torre, and Musi.

Historically, it included the village of Pers ( or Brieh), the westernmost ethnically Slovene village.

Accentual changes 
The Torre Valley dialect retains pitch accent on long syllables, which are still longer than short syllables. It has undergone only one accent shift on most of its territory: the  >  accent shift. However, the microdialects of Porzus, Prossenicco, and Subit have also undergone the  >  and  >  accent shifts, resulting in a new short stressed syllable. The microdialect of Subit still retains length on formerly stressed vowels after the latter shift.

Phonology 
Alpine Slavic and later lengthened  turned into , simplifying into  in the south. Nasal  and  evolved the same, but may not have merged with their non-nasal counterparts in all microdialects. Syllabic  turned into ~ in the west and into  in the east. Vowel reduction is not common. In some microdialects, particularly in the west, secondary nasalization of vowels occurs in sequences consisting of vowel + final /.

Eastern dialects simplified  into , whereas in the west it completely disappeared. In the far west (e.g., Torre), alveolar and post-alveolar sibilants merged. The consonant  mostly turned into . Palatal  is still palatal, and  turned into .

Morphology 
The morphology of the Torre Valley dialect differs greatly from that of standard Slovene, mainly because of influence of Romance languages.

The neuter gender exists in the singular, but it has been feminized in plural. The dialect has two future forms: future I, formed with the verb  'want' in the present tense followed by an infinitive, and future II, formed in the same way as the future in standard Slovene. The dialect also has a subjunctive, which is formed with  + the imperative form. The pluperfect still exists, as well as the long infinitive. The dialect also has -l, -n, and -ć (equivalent to standard Slovene -č) participles.

Writing and vocabulary
The dialect already appeared in written form in the Cividale manuscript in 1479, but it was not later used in written form. Today, because of the lack of a language policy and Italianization, the dialect has a very small number of speakers and is threatened with extinction. In 2009, a dictionary of the Torre Valley dialect was published, based on material mainly collected at the end of the 19th century, but also in the 20th century.

References

Bibliography 

 

 

Slovene dialects
Cultural heritage of Italy